The Department of National Defense (DND; , KTP) is the executive department of the Philippine government responsible for guarding against external and internal threats to peace and security in the country. The Department of National Defense exercises executive supervision over the Armed Forces of the Philippines (AFP), the Office of Civil Defense (OCD), the Philippine Veterans Affairs Office (PVAO), the National Defense College of the Philippines (NDCP), the Government Arsenal (GA), and Veterans Memorial Medical Center (VMMC). It is also responsible for disaster preparation and management in the country.

It is headed by the Secretary of National Defense, who is a member of the President's cabinet. The current OIC of the National Defense of the Philippines is Jose Faustino Jr. as of June 30, 2022.

History
The Department of National Defense or DND was formally organised on November 1, 1939, pursuant to Executive Order No. 230 of President Manuel L. Quezon to implement Commonwealth Act No. 1 or the National Defense Act of 1935 passed by the National Assembly on December 31, 1935, and Commonwealth Act No. 340 creating the department.

Throughout its existence, the department's functions are to enforce the law and to curb criminality and to guarantee the external and internal security of the country. As such, the DND deals also with criminal elements because the Philippine Constabulary or PC, then a major branch of the Armed Forces that has responsibility in enforcing the law and maintaining peace and order was under its supervision, aside from other AFP major services (Army, Navy, Air Force) which are busy dealing with fighting insurgents like the Communists and Muslim secessionists.

During Martial Law, the Ministry of National Defense (MND) became the most powerful ministry in the executive branch under the leadership of then Defense Minister Juan Ponce Enrile, who was then named martial law overseer by then President Ferdinand Marcos, the military
commander-in-chief. Also during Martial Law, Marcos, who assumed dictatorial powers issued a decree creating the National Intelligence and Security Authority or NISA, to be the country's national intelligence agency with broad powers over intelligence and national security. In effect, NISA also served as the secret police force of Marcos, and now became the most powerful agency, and the MND's status dwindled. The NISA was headed by General Fabian Ver, Marcos' most trusted man, who was also at that time, the commander of the then Presidential Security Command and later, was named to be the concurrent staff of the Armed Forces, thus becoming the most powerful military officer.

At the end of Marcos regime on 1986, the DND continued to exercise the powers to deal with criminality and internal plus external defense of the country until 1991 when then President Corazon Aquino signed a law passing the functions to enforce all criminal laws from DND to the Department of the Interior and Local Government or DILG. Both departments, however, shared the responsibility of guaranteeing internal security.

List of the Secretaries of the Department of National Defense

Organizational structure
The department is headed by the Secretary of National Defense, with the following five undersecretaries and assistant secretaries.
Undersecretary for National Defense/Senior Undersecretary
Undersecretary for Acquisition and Resource Management
Undersecretary for Civil, Veterans and Reserve Affairs
Undersecretary for Strategic Assessment and Planning
Undersecretary for Capability Assessment and Development
Assistant Secretary for Plans and Programs
Assistant Secretary for Human Resource
Assistant Secretary for Strategic Assessment and International Affairs
Assistant Secretary for Financial Management
Assistant Secretary for Logistics, Acquisitions and Self-Reliant Defense Posture
Assistant Secretary for Real Estate and Installations

Attached agencies
 Government Arsenal
 National Defense College of the Philippines
 National Security Council
 Office of Civil Defense
 Philippine Aerospace Development Corporation
 Philippine Veterans Affairs Office

Statistics

Budget

Citations

References

External links

 
 Armed Forces of the Philippines Website
 History of the Department of National Defense

 
Philippines, National Defense
Philippines
Defense